Carvico is a comune (municipality) in the Province of Bergamo in the Italian region of Lombardy, located about  northeast of Milan and about  west of Bergamo.

Carvico borders the following municipalities: Calusco d'Adda, Pontida, Sotto il Monte Giovanni XXIII, Terno d'Isola, Villa d'Adda.

Demographic evolution

International relations

Twin towns — Sister cities
Carvico is twinned with:
  Carvin (France)

References

External links
 www.comune.carvico.bg.it/